Huoshan is a county of western Anhui province, People's Republic of China, and is under the jurisdiction of Lu'an City. The government of Huoshan County is located in Hengshan Town.

Huoshan County has jurisdiction over nine towns and sixteen townships.

The county has a long history with over 2000 years, and the name "Huoshan" was first used during the Sui Dynasty.

Geography
Foziling Reservoir is a vast reservoir in the county.

Climate
Huoshan County has a monsoon-influenced humid subtropical climate (Köppen climate classification Cfa), cool, sometimes cold, winters, and hot and humid summers. A majority of the annual precipitation occurs from May to August. With monthly percent possible sunshine ranging from 34% in March to 47% in August, the county receives 1,844 hours of bright sunshine annually.

Administrative divisions
In the present, Huoshan County has 12 towns and 4 townships.
12 Towns

4 Townships

References

External links

County-level divisions of Anhui
Lu'an